The Flaz is a river in the Swiss region of Engadin. The Flaz starts at the confluence of Bernina with Roseg; after that Flaz flows in the territory of Pontresina and Samaden where its waters reaches the Inn.

References 

Rivers of Switzerland
Rivers of Graubünden
Engadin
Pontresina
Samedan